The Pansarbil (Lynx) m/39 and Pansarbil m/40 were Swedish 4x4 armoured cars of World War II.

History

AB Landsverk, who had developed the Landsverk L180, L181 and L182 family of armored cars, began developing the Pansarbil m/39 in 1937 as a private project. Sweden wasn't particularly interested so AB Landsverk pitted it against the British Alvis-Straussler AC3 in Denmark, after which an order for 18 vehicles were placed by the Danish army. The first prototype was available for trials in January 1938 and three vehicles were shipped to Denmark in April of 1938. Fifteen more vehicles were supposed to be delivered to Denmark but the German invasion of Denmark (1940) derailed this plan and the vehicles were instead requisitioned by Sweden. Thirty more vehicles were ordered by Sweden but, since Landsverk didn't have the capacity to produce them, the contract was fulfilled by Volvo and these vehicles bear the designation m/40. These were fitted with a m/40 automatic cannon instead of the 20mm Madsen cannon used in the prototypes, and with 145 hp Volvo engines.

Characteristics

The m/39 had a low slung body with well sloped, but thin, armor and used a modified Landsverk L-60 turret. The 140 hp Scania-Vabis engine was in the middle on the left side. It was able to be driven from both the front and the rear and featured a crew of six (commander, 3 gunners, and front and rear drivers). Both models were armed with three machine guns in addition to the main anti-tank gun (the m/39 used the 8mm Danish Madsen machine gun).

Operational History

The three m/39s delivered to Denmark were numbered PV9, PV10 and PV11, which formed the basis of two armored car squadrons attached to cavalry regiments. These were captured and used by German police units. Between 1941-43 the Swedish m/40 models were completed and participated in exercises with reconnaissance units. In 1956 thirteen Pansarbils were sold to the Dominican Republic.

Further reading
 Leland Ness (2002) Jane's World War II Tanks and Fighting Vehicles: The Complete Guide, Harper Collins, London and New York,

References

Main battle tanks of the Cold War
Armoured cars of the interwar period
Armoured fighting vehicles of Sweden
World War II armoured cars
Military vehicles introduced in the 1930s